Gabriel Nicolás Mezquida Sero (born 21 January 1992) is a Uruguayan professional footballer who plays as a midfielder for Greek Super League club Volos.

Club career
Mezquida began his career in the youth academy of C.A. Peñarol in 2006, before being promoted to the first team in the 2008 season. On January 22, 2009, at the age of 17, he signed a pre-contract with Schalke 04 worth a reported €2 million with the intent of joining the club at the end of the year. However, he changed his mind and decided to remain with C.A. Peñarol in South America. During his time with Peñarol, he had two loan spells with Norwegian clubs Brann and Lillestrøm. He joined Fénix in 2012, scoring one goal in 14 matches for the club. He was loaned out to Rampla Juniors in 2013 and scored seven goals in 24 matches for the club.

In September 2013, after leaving Fenix, Mezquida went on trial with Celtic of the Scottish Premiership but was ultimately not signed, potentially because of work permit eligibility issues, since he had not featured for the senior national side of Uruguay.

On February 5, 2014 Vancouver Whitecaps FC of Major League Soccer announced that they had signed Mezquida along with fellow Uruguayan Sebastián Fernández on a transfer from Boston River of the Uruguayan Segunda División where he had been playing since leaving Fenix. Mezquida went on to play five seasons for Vancouver, making 103 regular and postseason appearances, scoring 14 goals and adding four assists.

On December 9, 2018, Mezquida was traded along with $100,000 in TAM to the Colorado Rapids in exchange for Zac MacMath. In 2019, Mezquida made 32 MLS appearances while adding four goals and six assists - all career highs. In 2020, Mezquida made 17 appearances, 16 of them as a substitute, including in Colorado's first-round playoff loss at Minnesota United FC. Mezquida made his 150th career MLS regular season appearance on November 8 at Houston Dynamo.

On 28 June 2022, Mezquida was transferred to Greek Super League club Volos.

International career
Mezquida excelled whilst playing for Uruguay at U-15 level, scoring ten goals in 12 appearances, and was the top goal scorer at the 2007 South American Under-15 Football Championship, helping them finish as runners-up. He also played for the U-17 team at the international level.

Career statistics

Club

References

External links
 Whitecaps FC profile

Living people
1992 births
Uruguayan footballers
Footballers from Paysandú
Association football midfielders
Peñarol players
SK Brann players
Lillestrøm SK players
Centro Atlético Fénix players
Rampla Juniors players
Boston River players
Vancouver Whitecaps FC players
Whitecaps FC 2 players
Colorado Rapids players
Volos N.F.C. players
Uruguayan Primera División players
Eliteserien players
Uruguayan Segunda División players
Major League Soccer players
USL Championship players
MLS Next Pro players
Uruguayan expatriate footballers
Expatriate footballers in Norway
Uruguayan expatriate sportspeople in Norway
Expatriate soccer players in Canada
Uruguayan expatriate sportspeople in Canada
Expatriate soccer players in the United States
Uruguayan expatriate sportspeople in the United States
Expatriate footballers in Greece
Uruguayan expatriate sportspeople in Greece
Uruguay youth international footballers